Fortune may refer to:

General
 Fortuna or Fortune, the Roman goddess of luck
 Luck
 Wealth
 Fortune, a prediction made in fortune-telling
 Fortune, in a fortune cookie

Arts and entertainment

Film and television
 The Fortune (1931 film), a French film
 The Fortune, a 1975 American film
 Fortune TV, Burma
 Fortune: Million Pound Giveaway, a 2007 UK TV programme
 "Fortune" (Smallville), a US TV episode

Music
 Fortune Records, 1946–1995
 Fortune (band), 1980s, US
 The Fortunes, an English harmony beat group
 Fortune (Beni album), 2011
 Fortune (Callers album) and its title song, 2008
 Fortune (Chris Brown album), 2012
 "Fortune" (song), by Nami Tamaki, 2005
 "Fortune", a song by Emma Pollock from Watch the Fireworks, 2007
 "Fortune", a song by Great Big Sea from Sea of No Cares, 2002

Sports and games
 Fortune (Metal Gear), a video game character
 Fortune (professional wrestling)

Theatres
 Fortune Playhouse, a theatre in London, England
 Fortune Theatre, London, England
 Fortune Theatre, Dunedin
 New Fortune Theatre, University of Western Australia, Perth

Businesses
 Fortune Brands, a former US company
 Fortune Brands Home & Security, a successor company
 Fortune Tobacco, a Philippine company now part of PMFTC

People
 Fortune (name), a surname and given name
 Fortune (American slave) (c. 1743 – 1798), African-American slave

Periodicals
 Fortune (magazine), US
 Addis Fortune or Fortune, a newspaper in Addis Ababa, Ethiopia

Places
 Fortune, Newfoundland and Labrador, Canada
 Fortune Bay, Newfoundland, Canada
 Fortune (constituency), in Sham Shui Po District, Hong Kong
 Fortune, a barangay in Marikina, Philippines
 Fortune, Arkansas, an unincorporated community in the U.S.
 Fortuna, California or Fortune, California, U.S.
 Fortunen, Denmark
 Fortune Island (disambiguation)

Ships

 Fortune (1799 ship)
 Fortune (1800 ship)
 Fortune (1805 ship)
 Fortune (Plymouth Colony ship)
 HMS Fortune, ships of the Royal Navy, including:
 HMS Fortune (1778), a 14-gun sloop
 HMS Fortune (1913), an Acasta-class destroyer
 HMS Fortune (H70), an F-class destroyer
 HMCS Fortune (MCB 151), a Canadian minesweeper
 SS Fortune, a cargo ship
 USS Fortune (1865), a tugboat
 USS Fortune (IX-146), a cargo ship
 MSC Fortunate, a cargo ship also known as MV Fortune and MV Hyundai Fortune

Other uses
 , a Unix program
 Fortune, a typeface designed by Walter Baum

See also

 Fortuna (disambiguation)
 Misfortune (disambiguation)